Steve Rikert (born August 5, 1969 in Rhinebeck, New York) is a former racing driver who competed in the Barber Dodge Pro Series and the USF2000.

Career
After racing in the regional Skip Barber Eastern Series, Rikert moved to the Barber Saab Pro Series in 1994. The New Yorker finished outside the top ten in the 1994 Barber Saab Pro Series season. The Skip Barber Racing School graduate had a decent run in the 1996 Barber Dodge Pro Series season. Rikert finished fifth at Watkins Glen International. He earned points on several occasions finishing thirteenth in final standings. Rikert ran only six Barber Dodge Pro Series races in 1997. 

The New York native first made his USF2000 debut at Mid-Ohio Sports Car Course in Lexington, Ohio. In a field of fifty drivers, Rikert finished seventeenth. He also participated in the season finale at Watkins Glen. For 1998 Rikert signed with the factory Tatuus team in the USF2000. The New Yorker finished tenth in the standings, best of the factory entered Tatuus chassis. For 1999 Rikert made the switch to the dominant Van Diemen chassis. The American won one race at Atlanta Motor Speedway from start to finish. The race was marred by a red flag after a heavy crash involving Larry Foyt and five other. The Richard Morgan Racing driver scored another two podium finishes. He eventually finished third in the championship standings, behind Marc-Antoine Camirand and series champion Dan Wheldon.

Rikert currently owns an automobile repair shop in his native town of Rhinebeck.

Complete motorsports results

American Open-Wheel racing results
(key) (Races in bold indicate pole position, races in italics indicate fastest race lap)

Complete USF2000 National Championship results

References

External links
 
 Steve Rikert at USFF2000.com
 Steve Rikert career history at USF2000.com

1969 births
Living people
Racing drivers from New York (state)
Barber Pro Series drivers
U.S. F2000 National Championship drivers
People from Rhinebeck, New York